The Northrop M2-F2 was a heavyweight lifting body based on studies at NASA's Ames and Langley research centers and built by the Northrop Corporation in 1966.

Development
The success of Dryden's M2-F1 program led to NASA's development and construction of two heavyweight lifting bodies based on studies at NASA's Ames and Langley research centers—the M2-F2 and the HL-10, both built by the Northrop Corporation. The "M" refers to "manned" and "F" refers to "flight" version. "HL" comes from "horizontal landing" and 10 is for the tenth lifting body model to be investigated by Langley.

On March 23, 1966 the M2-F2 made its first captive flight—attached to the B-52 carrier aircraft throughout. The first free gliding flight of the M2-F2 was on July 12, 1966, piloted by Milton O. Thompson.

Operational history

Before powered flights were undertaken, a series of glide flights were conducted. On May 10, 1967, the sixteenth and last glide flight ended in disaster as the vehicle slammed into the lake bed on landing. With test pilot Bruce Peterson at the controls, the M2-F2 suffered a pilot induced oscillation (PIO) as it neared the lake bed. At the core of this problem was the fact that the wings of the M2-F2 (essentially the body of the aircraft) produced considerably less roll authority than most aircraft. This resulted in less force available to the pilot to control the aircraft in roll. The vehicle rolled from side to side in flight as he tried to bring it under control. Peterson recovered, but then observed a rescue helicopter that seemed to pose a collision threat. Distracted, Peterson drifted in a crosswind to an unmarked area of the lake bed where it was very difficult to judge the height over the ground because of a lack of guidance (the markers provided on the lake bed runway).

Peterson fired the landing rockets to provide additional lift, but he hit the lake bed before the landing gear was fully down and locked. The M2-F2 rolled over six times, coming to rest upside down.  Pulled from the vehicle by Jay King and Joseph Huxman, Peterson was rushed to the base hospital, transferred to the March Air Force Base Hospital and then the UCLA Hospital. He recovered but lost vision in his right eye due to a staphylococcal infection.

Portions of M2-F2 footage including Peterson's spectacular crash landing were used for the 1973 television series The Six Million Dollar Man  though some shots during the opening credits of the series showed the later HL-10 model, during release from its carrier plane, a modified B-52.

Four pilots flew the M2-F2 on its 16 glide flights. They were Milton O. Thompson (five flights), Bruce Peterson (three flights), Don Sorlie (three flights) and Jerry Gentry (five flights).

NASA pilots and researchers realized the M2-F2 had lateral control problems, even though it had a stability augmentation control system. When the M2-F2 was rebuilt at Dryden and redesignated the M2-F3, it was modified with an additional third vertical fin—centered between the tip fins to improve control characteristics.

The M2-F2/F3 was the first of the heavyweight, entry-configuration lifting bodies. Its successful development as a research test vehicle answered many of the generic questions about these vehicles.

M2-F2 flights

NASA M2-F2 - NASA 803, 16 unpowered flights

Specifications (M2-F2)

See also

References

External links

Most of text taken from NASA Dryden webpage.
NASA Dryden M2-F2 Photo Collection
NASA Dryden M2-F2 Video Collection
Wingless Flight: The Lifting Body Story. NASA History Series SP-4220 1997 PDF
Video of Peterson's crash

Lifting bodies
M2-F2, Northrop
M2-F2, Northrop
M2-F2, Northrop